The 2014 Vattenfall Cyclassics was the 19th edition of the Vattenfall Cyclassics, a single-day cycling race. It is the 23rd race of the 2014 UCI World Tour season. It was won in the sprint by Alexander Kristoff, ahead of Giacomo Nizzolo and Simon Gerrans.

Teams
As the Vattenfall Cyclassics was a UCI World Tour event, all 18 UCI ProTeams were invited automatically and obligated to send a squad. One Professional Continental team –  – was given a wildcard place into the race. The peloton was therefore made up of 19 team.

The 19 teams that competed in the race were:

 †

Results

References

External links

 

Vattenfall Cyclassics
Vattenfall Cyclassics
2014